Miangas Airport  is an airport located on the island of Miangas, North Sulawesi. It is one of the most remote airport in Indonesia. The construction project started in 2012 and it was opened on 12 March 2017. The airport was built in 2012 with a construction investment of  billion. Wings Air opened its inaugural flight from Manado to Miangas Airport, transiting at Melangguane Airport. The flight operates once a week on Sunday.

Facilities

The airport has one runway designated as 03/21 with an asphalt surface measuring 1,400 by 30 metres which can accommodate planes such as ATR-72. It also has a 130 by 65 metres apron sufficient for operating three aircraft at the same time. This airport also houses a 356 square metre terminal warehouse.

Airlines and destinations

References 

Airports in North Sulawesi